Treat Conrad Huey and Dominic Inglot were the defending champions but Inglot decided not to participate.
Huey played alongside Bobby Reynolds.
John Peers and John-Patrick Smith defeated Jarmere Jenkins and Jack Sock 7–5, 6–1 in the final.

Seeds

Draw

Draw

References
 Main Draw

Charlottesville Men's Pro Challenger - Doubles
2012 Doubles